I. Polavaram or Island Polavaram is a village in I. Polavaram Mandal, located in Konaseema district of the Indian state of Andhra Pradesh. I.Polavaram mandal comes under Mummidivaram constituency and is a part of Konaseema.

References 

Villages in I. Polavaram mandal